Bhola Stadium is a multi-purpose stadium in Bhola, Bangladesh.

See also
 Stadiums in Bangladesh
 List of cricket grounds in Bangladesh

References

Cricket grounds in Bangladesh
Football venues in Bangladesh